The 1993 South Pacific Mini Games were held at Port Vila in Vanuatu from 6–16 December  1993. It was the fourth edition of the South Pacific Mini Games.

Participating countries
Fifteen Pacific nations participated in the Games:

Note: A number in parentheses indicate the size of a country's team (where known).

Sports
The six sports contested at the 1993 South Pacific Mini Games were:

 
   
 

 
 
 

Note: A number in parentheses indicates how many medal events were contested in that sport (where known).

Final medal table
Fiji topped the medal count:

See also
Athletics at the 1993 South Pacific Mini Games

References

Pacific Games by year
Pacific Games
Pacific Games
 
1993 in Vanuatuan sport
International sports competitions hosted by Vanuatu
December 1993 sports events in Oceania